The Upside of Irrationality: The Unexpected Benefits of Defying Logic is a book published in 2010 by behavioral economist Dan Ariely. This is Ariely's second published book, after he authored Predictably Irrational: The Hidden Forces That Shape Our Decisions.

Dan Ariely is the James B. Duke Professor of Psychology and Behavioral Economics. He teaches at Duke University and is the founder of The Center for Advanced Hindsight and also the co-founder of BEworks. He started the book after receiving raving reviews from his first book, as The Upside extends upon the behavioral ideas initially presented in Predictably Irrational.

In this book, Ariely uses his traditional style of scholarly writing: short, succinct, to the point, and easy to understand for laypeople. He describes different experiments and how individuals participating in these experiments reacted to the variable of irrationality, which Ariely argues can be used for positive change. Many readers report that at times, The Upside of Irrationality comes across as a lighter, less elegant version of Predictably Irrational, although still a quality piece of academic-social work.

References

Sociology books